Daily Stop (Chinese: 地利店) was a chain of convenience stores in Hong Kong. It was franchised by Television Broadcasts Limited (TVB) and SCMP Group before it was acquired by Dairy Farm International Holdings and merged to 7-Eleven. It operated totally 83 outlets in MTR and KCR stations, shopping malls and public housing estates. Its main competitors were 7-Eleven and Circle K.

History
Daily Stop was established in 1982 to sell TVB-related products. In 1988, it became a subsidiary of TVE Holdings. In 1996, it was acquired by Robert Kuok's Kerry Group and became a subsidiary of SCMP Group. In 2004, it was sold to Dairy Farm International Holdings and rebranded as "7-Eleven".

References

1982 establishments in Hong Kong
Convenience stores
Defunct companies of Hong Kong
Defunct retail companies
Kerry Group
Retail companies established in 1982
Retail companies disestablished in 2004
Retail companies of Hong Kong
TVB